The simple-station Flores is part of the TransMilenio mass-transit system of Bogotá, Colombia, opened in the year 2000.

Location

The station is located in northern Bogotá, specifically Avenida Caracas, between Calles 67 and 69.

History

In 2000, phase one of the TransMilenio system was opened between Portal de la 80 and Tercer Milenio, including this station.  The station is named Flores due to its proximity to the flower market named Plaza las Flores, which is located on the east side of the station.  It serves the Chapinero, La Concepción, and La Esperanza neighborhoods.

Station Services

Old trunk services

Main Line Service

Feeder routes

This station does not have connections to feeder routes.

Inter-city service

This station does not have inter-city service.

External links

TransMilenio
suRumbo.com

See also
Bogotá
TransMilenio
List of TransMilenio Stations

TransMilenio